Sakura Samurai: Art of the Sword is an action-adventure game developed by Grounding Inc. and published by Nintendo for the Nintendo 3DS's eShop.

Gameplay

Plot
A young, nameless samurai hero sometimes referred to as "Sakura Samurai", trained by an old kappa and dubbed as the Sakura Samurai (or Hana Samurai), travels the game's world to rescue a kidnapped princess called Cherry Blossom, a daughter of the cherry blossom god in the Land of the Rising Sun.

Reception
Audrey Drake of IGN gave the game a 9/10 for its distinct charm, art style, and fulfilling gameplay. 		
Vaughn Highfield of Pocket Gamer gave the game an 8.0/10.

Nintendo Life gave the game an 8.0/10 saying that Sakura Samurai: Art of the Sword may not be the prettiest game on the eShop but it sure is one of the most challenging, striking a good balance between difficulty and precision.

Other media 
The character Sakura Samurai appears as a trophy exclusively in the 3DS version of Super Smash Bros. for Nintendo 3DS and Wii U. He also appears in Super Smash Bros. Ultimate as a collectible Spirit.

External links

References

2011 video games
Nintendo games
Nintendo 3DS eShop games
Nintendo 3DS-only games
Nintendo 3DS games
Video games about samurai
Video games developed in Japan
Video games set in feudal Japan